Our Lady of Solitude is a title of Mary, mother of Jesus and a special form of Marian devotion practised in Spanish-speaking countries to commemorate the solitude of Mary on Holy Saturday. Variant names include Nuestra Señora de la Soledad, Maria Santisima, Nuestra Señora Dolorosisima de la Soledad, and Virgen de la Soledad.

History
The title originates with Queen Juana lamenting the early death of her husband Philip I of Castile in 1506.

Feast

"This devotion was instituted to compassionate Our Lady for her solitude on Holy Saturday and is akin to the devotion practiced among the Servites on Good Friday called the Desolata."

María de la Soledad's feast day is celebrated on December 18 in Spanish-speaking countries, on Holy Saturday in English-speaking, and on Good Friday in Portuguese-speaking countries. In Oaxaca, Mexico devotions are held on the Sunday before Christmas.

In the convent of Our Lady of Victory 

Isabel de Valois, wife of Felipe II, had in a private oratory a painting that she had brought with her from France and that represented the Virgin of the Solitude. The image of the picture aroused great devotion in the friars of the Order of the Minims of San Francisco de Paula, who had settled in Madrid following in the footsteps of the monarch. The friars asked permission of the queen to have a copy of the image for the chapel of their convent of Our Lady of Victory in Madrid. The image of Our Lady of Solitude was carved by the sculptor Gaspar Becerra.

From the beginning, the image was intended to be "vestidera", with only the head and hands carved and the rest a wooden frame covered with clothes. It seems that on the initiative of the Countess of Ureña, Dña María de la Cueva y Toledo, the queen's main waitress, she wore her own outfit of a noble widow of the time; this characteristic attire added to other peculiarities – such as wearing a diadem in place of crown, or be accompanied by the symbols of the Passion – constituted a true revolution in the typology of Marian images.

In 1565, finally, after more than a year of work, the statue of Our Lady of Solitude was presented to the convent of Our Lady of Victory.

Patroness
María de la Soledad is the patroness of Badajos and Parla, Spain; Porto Covo, Portugal;  and Acapulco, Mexico; and of Cavite Province, Philippines, under the name Nuestra Señora de la Soledad de Porta Vaga and in the town of San Isidro, province of Nueva Ecija under the title of Nuestra Señora de la Soledad de San Isidro.

The Mission Nuestra Señora de la Soledad in Soledad, California, is dedicated to Our Lady of Solitude.

Pontifical approbations

 Pope Pius X granted a Canonical coronation towards a Nuestra Señora de la Soledad image for the Oaxaca on 18 January 1904.
 Pope Pius XI granted a Canonical coronation towards an Our Lady of Solitude image for the Irapuato on 30 April 1922.
 Pope Pius XII granted a Canonical coronation towards a Nuestra Señora de la Soledad de Parral image for the Parral, Chihuahua, on 22 October 1943.
 Pope John XXIII granted a Canonical coronation towards a Nuestra Señora de la Soledad de la Portería image for the Las Palmas on 19 March 1964.
 Pope Paul VI granted a Canonical coronation towards a Nuestra Señora de la Soledad de Acapulco image for the Acapulco on 8 December 1965.
 Pope John Paul II granted a Canonical coronation towards a Maria Santissima de la Soledad image for the Priego de Córdoba on 26 June 1994.
 Pope Francis granted a Canonical coronation towards a Nuestra Señora de la Soledad de Porta Vaga image for the Cavite on 18 November 2018.
 Pope Francis granted a Canonical coronation towards a Nuestra Señora de la Soledad image for the Ciempozuelos on 4 May 2019.
 Pope Francis granted a Canonical coronation towards a Our Lady of Solitude of Mafra image for the Mafra on 10 November 2020.

Name
The given name María de la Soledad, often shortened to Marisol or Soledad, is used in Spanish-speaking countries.

See also
 Our Lady of Sorrows
 Soledad (disambiguation) mentions many people, places, and institutions named for María de la Soledad

References

External links 

 "Nuestra Señora de la Soledad", Christian Iconography

Marian devotions
Titles of Mary